Union Township is a township in Worth County, in the U.S. state of Missouri.

Union Township was organized in 1856.

References

Townships in Missouri
Townships in Worth County, Missouri